Joseph Van Dam (Willebroek, 2 November 1901 — Willebroek, 31 May 1986) was a Belgian professional road bicycle racer. Van Dam entered the 1926 Tour de France, won three stages and finished 12th place in the general classification

Major results

1924
 national cyclo-cross championship
1926
Brussels-Liège for amateurs
1926 Tour de France:
Winner stages 6, 8 and 15
12th place overall classification

External links 

Official Tour de France results for Joseph van Dam

Belgian male cyclists
1901 births
1986 deaths
Belgian Tour de France stage winners
People from Willebroek
Cyclists from Antwerp Province
Belgian cyclo-cross champions
20th-century Belgian people